Darun Aman Mosque or Ban Haw Mosque, is the biggest mosque in Chiang Rai Province. The mosque was one of the mosques in northern Thailand built by Hui people, known as Chin Haw in Thai.

Design
The new building was opened on 27 December 2009, replacing the old one. It is a mixture of Chinese and Islamic architecture. The main structure is influenced by Persian architecture with Chinese decorations. The tip of the two minarets has been replaced with the small Chinese pavilion, instead of a typical Islamic dome. Its total cost was around 20 million baht.

Gallery

See also 
Ban Ho Mosque, Chinese mosque, Chiang Mai Province
Islam in Thailand

Notes

External links 

  Darunaman Mosque (Thai)

Mosque buildings with domes
2009 establishments in Thailand
Mosques completed in 2009
Mosques in Thailand